= Sweden International Improv Festival =

- Genre: Mixed forms of Improvisational theatre
- Dates: March
- Locations: Uppsala, Sweden
- Years active: 2015–present
- Founders: Teater Prego, Reginateatern

Sweden International Improv Festival, abbreviated as SWIMP, is an international festival for improvisational theatre. The festival was first hosted in 2015 at Reginateatern in Uppsala, Sweden.

The festival goes on for four days and fosters workshops and shows by improvisers and instructors from different parts of the world. One of the main ambitions with the festival is to create meaningful artistic exchanges and form relations between artists and visitors from all over the world.

During the first three years of SWIMP, improvisational theatre companies and workshop instructors from 17 countries have participated. Some of the countries represented are the United States, Italy, India, Belgium, England, the Netherlands, Scotland and Argentina. The festival intends to represent a diverse range of nationalities. SWIMP also has a preference for having a broad representation of performers on stage and has made equal gender representation one of their main goals.

SWIMP is produced and hosted by Teater Prego and Reginateatern. Reginateatern is the oldest theatre in Uppsala.

== See also ==
- Improvisational theatre
